In 2001, cartoonist Daryl Cagle started Cagle Cartoons, Inc., which distributes the cartoons of sixty editorial cartoonists and fourteen columnists to more than 850 subscribing newspapers in the United States and around the world, including over half of America's daily, paid-circulation newspapers. Cagle Cartoons syndicates the political cartoons of four Pulitzer Prize winners — Adam Zyglis, Mike Keefe, Kevin Siers, and Steve Sack.

Cagle Cartoons also syndicates the political cartoons of four winners of the “Cow” or the “Grand Prix de l'Humour Vache” from the Salon International de la Caricature, du Dessin de Presse et d’humour” in Saint-Just-le-Martel, France — Patrick Chappatte (2021), Rayma Suprani (2014), Angel Boligan (2017) and Daryl Cagle (2013).

Cagle Cartoons is a "package service" where subscribing publications receive all of the content and can reprint whatever they choose for one fee. Cagle also refuses to charge delivery fees for his service, noting digital delivery replaced the cost of mailing features years ago.

A cartoon spotlighting racial injustice drawn by David Fitzsimmons of the Arizona Daily Star, whose work is syndicated by Cagle Cartoons, drew controversy after it was shared to 8th-grade students by a teacher as part of an assignment to interpret the cartoon. Texas Gov. Greg Abbott called for the teacher to be fired.

Notable cartoonists and columnists syndicated by Cagle Cartoons

References

External links

Print syndication
Comic strip syndicates